Technoclash is an action RPG created by Electronic Arts in 1993 for the Mega Drive/Genesis.

Story
A world populated by wizards is invaded by a race of machines, causing havoc. Ronaan, a wizard, embarks on a journey after a magical staff is stolen from his homeland. Ronaan, Farrg and Chaz must prevent the destruction of their world as they travel through Las Vegas, a junkyard, a desert and the heart of the Machine Empire.

Gameplay
At the beginning of each level, players choose the magic apprentice Chaz or the mercenary Farrg as their partner.

Reception
The four reviewers of Electronic Gaming Monthly gave the game a 6.5 out of 10, deeming it "a poor man's Gauntlet". They commented that the variety of weapons and spells is good but that the game is hard to the point where it is impossible to derive enjoyment out of it, particularly criticizing that the backgrounds make it hard to see enemies and other hazards.

Ove Kaufeldt reviewed Technoclash for Swedish magazine Datormagazin in 1994. Kaufeldt felt that neither the graphics nor sound were great, the game was still really fun, and enjoyed the assortment of weapons.

References

1993 video games
Action video games
Electronic Arts games
Role-playing video games
Sega Genesis games
Sega Genesis-only games
Video games set in the Las Vegas Valley
Video games set in Nevada
Single-player video games
Video games developed in the United States